Rose Cossar (born July 4, 1991), also known as Rosie, is a Canadian rhythmic gymnast, who represented Canada at the 2011 World Rhythmic Gymnastics Championships, the 2011 Pan American Games and the 2012 Summer Olympics.

Background
Ocssar was born in England and raised in Canada, She began her career in gymnastics in 1996, and competed internationally for the first time at the 2001 Happy Cup in Belgium.

Competitive career
Cossar was team leader of the rhythmic gymnastics team, which also included Katrina Cameron, Kelsey Titmarsh, Alexandra Landry, Anastasiya Muntyanu and Anjelika Reznik.

At the World Rhythmic Gymnastics Championships in September 2011, the team placed 17th, and earned Canada's first-ever Olympic berth in the event. At the Pan American Games in October, the team won silver in the women's rhythmic group 3 ribbons + 2 hoops and the women's rhythmic group all-around, and bronze in the women's rhythmic group 5 balls.

At the 2012 Olympics, the team placed 11th in the women's rhythmic group all-around.

Post-competition
In December 2014, Cossar publicly came out as lesbian. She had already been out to her teammates for several years, but had not previously spoken to the media about her sexuality. Since the 2012 Olympics, she has worked with Toronto's The 519 Church Street Community Centre on the creation of Pride House Toronto, a resource house for LGBT athletes being launched for the 2015 Pan American Games, and is a spokesperson for the Canadian Olympic Committee in its new program to combat homophobia in sports.

References

Canadian rhythmic gymnasts
Gymnasts at the 2011 Pan American Games
Gymnasts at the 2012 Summer Olympics
Olympic gymnasts of Canada
Living people
1991 births
Sportspeople from Ontario
Canadian LGBT sportspeople
Lesbian sportswomen
LGBT gymnasts
Pan American Games silver medalists for Canada
Pan American Games bronze medalists for Canada
Pan American Games medalists in gymnastics
Medalists at the 2011 Pan American Games
20th-century Canadian women
21st-century Canadian women
21st-century Canadian LGBT people
20th-century Canadian LGBT people